Larry Sengstock (born 4 March 1960 in Maryborough, Queensland) is an Australian retired basketball player and was the CEO of Basketball Australia and the NBL until April 2012.

Career
Larry was born in Maryborough Qld. He was a champion swimmer but was lured to the sport of basketball by his primary school teacher Ray Alloway. Larry was a tall boy for his age and Ray Alloway thought he would be a great asset to the game of basketball.  Larry was taught the fundamentals of the game by his school teacher, which led them both to succeed together in Regional, State and Australian Championships.  Becoming the First Queensland team to win at an Australian Championship in 1975. Larry completed his senior year at Aldridge State High School in Maryborough.  Many visiting teams from the USA made offers for him to move to the US, but he stayed in Australia.  He has always accredited his first coach/School teacher, Ray Alloway for giving him a solid grounding in the fundamentals of the game. 
Larry played for Lang Park Basketball club as a junior. He was one of the star players in the early years of Australia's fledgling National Basketball League (NBL). Sengstock played 456 NBL games over 18 seasons, starting with the St. Kilda Saints and later playing for the Brisbane Bullets, Gold Coast Rollers and North Melbourne Giants.

Sengstock won five NBL championship rings, his first coming in 1979 with St Kilda. He was named Most Valuable Player in the 1979 Grand Final; twenty years later, the Grand Final MVP award would be renamed the Larry Sengstock Medal in his honour.

Sengstock would also win an NBL championship in 1980, again with St. Kilda. That year he was also named to the Australian Olympic team for the first time and played for the Boomers in 1980 Summer Olympics in Moscow, Russia.  He also represented Australia at the 1984 Summer Olympics in Los Angeles (USA), 1988 (Seoul, South Korea) and 1992 in Barcelona, Spain, and at four FIBA World Championship tournaments (1978, 1982, 1986 and 1990).

As a member of the Brisbane Bullets he won two more NBL titles in 1985 and 1987, and won his last title as a North Melbourne Giant in 1994.

Sengstock scored 5,466 career points (11.9 ppg) and recorded 3,221 rebounds (7.0 rpg); He is tenth on the NBL's all-time rebounding list entering the 2003/04 season.

Accolades
He was named to the All-NBL First Team in 1982, and was a unanimous selection for the NBL's Hall of Fame in 2001.

Honour roll

NBL career stats

Notes 

1960 births
Living people
Australian men's basketball players
1978 FIBA World Championship players
1982 FIBA World Championship players
1990 FIBA World Championship players
Australian sports executives and administrators
Basketball players at the 1980 Summer Olympics
Basketball players at the 1984 Summer Olympics
Basketball players at the 1988 Summer Olympics
Basketball players at the 1992 Summer Olympics
Basketball players from Brisbane
Brisbane Bullets players
Gold Coast Rollers players
North Melbourne Giants players
Olympic basketball players of Australia
People from Maryborough, Queensland
Small forwards
1986 FIBA World Championship players
Sportsmen from Queensland